Ricciarelli are traditional Italian biscuits – specifically, a type of macaroon – originating in 14th century Siena. It is considered one of the signature sweets of Siena, in addition to panforte, cenci, and cavallucci.

Background
Legend holds that they were introduced by Ricciardetto della Gherardesca in his castle near Volterra upon his return from the Crusades. He purportedly said that the "foreign biscuits curled like the Sultan's slippers". The modern biscuit does not exhibit curling. In medieval times, they were known as marzapanetti alla senese or morzelletti. They acquired the name ricciarelli in the 1800s.

An alternative etymology, from the Treccani Italian dictionary, indicates the word 'ricciarèlli' is derived from 'rìccio,' meaning 'hedgehog,' perhaps for the original form. Particularly when coated with sliced almonds, the cookie looks like a hedgehog.

Preparation
Today, the biscuits are made using an almond base with sugar, honey and egg white. When prepared in the traditional method, the almonds are ground with a milling machine, and the finished mix is formed into numerous oval- or lozenge-shaped cookies of about  each that are set aside for two days before baking. After baking, they are removed from the oven and allowed to cool for 15 minutes, to prevent the cookies from breaking, before transferring them to wire racks. They may be baked with rice paper, which is trimmed to the shape of the cookie after they have cooled. The rough and crackled surface is usually lightly sprinkled with confectioner's sugar, and may also be covered in dark chocolate.

Ricciarelli are typically consumed at Christmas, served  with a dessert wine such as Vin Santo or Moscadello di Montalcino.

Packaged cookies sold at retail are traditionally enveloped in a blue paper tissue depicting two winged horses from the Etruscan Archeological Museum in Volterra.

References

Biscuits
Italian desserts
Christmas food
Cuisine of Tuscany
Almond cookies
Italian products with protected designation of origin